Anasimyia anausis  (Meigen 1822), the moon-shaped swamp fly, is a fairly common species of syrphid fly observed  across North America. Hoverflies can remain nearly motionless in flight. The  adults are also  known as flower flies for they are commonly found on flowers from which they get both energy-giving nectar and protein rich pollen. Larvae of this genus are of the rat-tailed type living in aquatic environments.

References

Insects described in 1822
Eristalinae